Man and Nature: Or, Physical Geography as Modified by Human Action, first published in 1864, was written by American polymath scholar and diplomat George Perkins Marsh. Marsh intended it to show that "whereas [others] think the earth made man, man in fact made the earth". As a result, he warned that man could destroy himself and the Earth if we don't restore and sustain global resources and raise awareness about our actions. It is one of the first works to document the effects of human action on the environment and it helped to launch the modern conservation movement.

Marsh is remembered by scholars as a profound and observant student of men, books and nature with a wide range of interests ranging from history to poetry and literature. His wide array of knowledge and great natural powers of mind gave him the ability to speak and write about every topic of inquire with the assertive authority of a genuine investigator. He initially got the idea for "man and Nature" from his observations in his New England home and his foreign travels devoted to similar inquiries.  Marsh wrote the book in line with the view that human life and action is a transformative phenomenon, especially in relation to nature, and due to personal economic interests. He felt that men were too quick to lessen their sense of responsibility and he was  "unwilling to leave the world worse than he found it".

The book challenges the myth of the inexhaustibility of the earth and the belief that human impact on the environment is negligible by drawing similarities to the ancient civilization of the Mediterranean. Marsh argued that ancient Mediterranean civilizations collapsed through environmental degradation. Deforestation led to eroded soils that led to decreased soil productivity. Additionally, the same trends could be found occurring in the United States. The book was one of the most influential books of its time, next to Charles Darwin's On the Origin of Species, inspiring conservation and reform in the USA since it forebode what happened to an ancient civilisation when it depleted and exhausted its natural resources. The book was instrumental in the creation of Adirondack Park in New York and the United States National Forest. Gifford Pinchot, first Chief of the United States Forest Service, called it "epoch making" and Stewart Udall wrote that it was "the beginning of land wisdom in this country."

The book is divided into six chapters.
 Introductory
 Transfer, Modification, and Extirpation of Vegetable and of Animal Species
 The Woods
 The Waters
 The Sands
 Projected or Possible Geographical Changes by Man

See also
Anthropocene
 Collapse: How Societies Choose to Fail or Succeed

References

Further reading

External links 
 Man and Nature at Internet Archive (digital editions)
  Full Text of Book from the Library of Congress

1864 non-fiction books
1860s in the environment
Environmental non-fiction books
George Perkins Marsh
Environmental conservation
Books about environmentalism
Works about societal collapse